Brighton Town Hall could refer to:

Brighton Town Hall, South Australia
Brighton Town Hall, New York, USA
Brighton Town Hall, England
Brighton Town Hall, Melbourne, Australia
Hove Town Hall, Brighton and Hove, England